The General Political Bureau (GPB) is the internal politburo of the Korean People's Army (KPA), used by the leadership of the North Korean government to exert political control over the military. The GPB is subordinate to the Ministry of Defence and operates under the direction of the Central Committee of the Workers' Party of Korea. The GPB controls units of the KPA on all levels down to company level. It primarily exerts control through propaganda, education, and cultural activities. Under directions of the State Affairs Commission of North Korea, it also controls troop movements.

During Kim Jong-il's Songun (military first) era in particular, the GPB remained relatively independent and unchanged for decades. However, after the 2016 7th Congress of the Workers' Party of Korea under Kim Jong-un, the party had regained enough power to exert influence over the GPB. Consequentially, in 2017 the party Central Committee was ordered to carry out an inspection of the GPB, the first of its kind in 20 years. The inspection was carried out by Choe Ryong-hae.

, the Director of the General Political Bureau is Jong Kyong-thaek, who succeeded Kwon Yong-jin.

In popular culture
The General Political Bureau (GPB) is featured in the South Korean drama Crash Landing on You, where the main character Ri Jeong-hyeok has power and authority in Korean People's Army due to his father being the Director of the GPB.

See also

General Staff Department of the Korean People's Army
Political commissar

References

Works cited
 

Military of North Korea
Politics of North Korea
Government of North Korea